Carex willdenowii, common name Willdenow's sedge, is a species of Carex native to North America.

Conservation status
It is listed as endangered in Connecticut It is also listed as threatened in Illinois  and New York (state).

References

willdenowii
Flora of North America